This is a list of horror films released in the 1900s.

List

See also
 Lists of horror films

References

Citations

Bibliography

 
 
 

1900s

Horror